Wilcoxon is a surname, and may refer to:
 Charles Wilcoxon, drum educator
 Henry Wilcoxon, an actor
 Frank Wilcoxon, chemist and statistician, inventor of two non-parametric tests for statistical significance:
 The Wilcoxon signed-rank test (also known as the Wilcoxon T test)
 The Wilcoxon rank-sum test (also known as the Mann–Whitney U test).

See also
Wilcox (surname)